The February 1902 South Down by-election was held on 19 February 1902.  The by-election was held following the resignation of the previous member Michael McCartan who was a member of the Irish Parliamentary Party. It was won unopposed by the Irish Parliamentary Party candidate Jeremiah McVeagh.

Result

External links 
A Vision Of Britain Through Time

References

1902 elections in the United Kingdom
By-elections to the Parliament of the United Kingdom in County Down constituencies
20th century in County Down
Unopposed by-elections to the Parliament of the United Kingdom in Irish constituencies